Franklin is a city in Franklin County, Idaho, United States. The population was 641 at the 2010 census. It is part of the Logan, Utah-Idaho Metropolitan Statistical Area.

History
The town was founded by Mormon pioneers led by Thomas S. Smart on April 14, 1860, in what was then Washington Territory, although at the time it was believed the settlement was within the bounds of Utah Territory. The town was named for Franklin Richards, an Apostle for the Church of Jesus Christ of Latter-day Saints. Franklin is the first permanent European settlement in present-day Idaho. The area within the town limits was platted into square blocks in 1864.

Part of the 2004 comedy film Napoleon Dynamite were shot near Franklin. The chicken farm scenes were filmed on Ritewood Egg Farms property, and the supervisor's character is loosely based on Marlow Woodward, a late Franklin resident and one of the farm's founders.

Geography

Demographics

2010 census
As of the census of 2010, there were 641 people, 221 households, and 155 families living in the city. The racial makeup of the city was 91.1% White, 0.5% African American, 0.5% Native American, 6.2% from other races, and 1.7% from two or more races. Hispanic or Latino of any race were 13.1% of the population.

There were 221 households, of which 42.5% had children under the age of 18 living with them, 62.4% were married couples living together, 5.0% had a female householder with no husband present, 2.7% had a male householder with no wife present, and 29.9% were non-families. 26.7% of all households were made up of individuals, and 12.2% had someone living alone who was 65 years of age or older. The average household size was 2.90 and the average family size was 3.61.

The median age in the city was 29.9 years. 34.3% of residents were under the age of 18; 9.8% were between the ages of 18 and 24; 23.9% were from 25 to 44; 19.2% were from 45 to 64; and 12.6% were 65 years of age or older. The gender makeup of the city was 49.8% male and 50.2% female.

2000 census
As of the census of 2000, there were 641 people, 195 households, and 156 families living in the city. The racial makeup of the city was 88.92% White, 0.16% Native American, 9.05% from other races, and 1.87% from two or more races. Hispanic or Latino of any race were 9.67% of the population.

There were 195 households, out of which 47.7% had children under the age of 18 living with them, 69.2% were married couples living together, 5.1% had a female householder with no husband present, and 20.0% were non-families. 17.9% of all households were made up of individuals, and 10.8% had someone living alone who was 65 years of age or older.  The average household size was 3.29 and the average family size was 3.79.

In the city, the population was spread out, with 40.1% under the age of 18, 8.9% from 18 to 24, 26.8% from 25 to 44, 14.7% from 45 to 64, and 9.5% who were 65 years of age or older.  The median age was 26 years. For every 100 females, there were 94.2 males.  For every 100 females age 18 and over, there were 101.0 males.

The median income for a household in the city was $33,026, and the median income for a family was $34,191. Males had a median income of $27,417 versus $24,000 for females. The per capita income for the city was $10,346.  About 10.9% of families and 14.1% of the population were below the poverty line, including 19.0% of those under age 18 and 10.3% of those age 65 or over.

References

Further reading

External links
  - City of Franklin

Cities in Idaho
Cities in Franklin County, Idaho
Logan metropolitan area
Populated places established in 1860
1860 establishments in Washington Territory